The Southern Nantahala Wilderness was designated in 1984 and currently consists of . The Wilderness is managed by the United States Forest Service and is part of the National Wilderness Preservation System. The Appalachian Trail passes through the Wilderness in both states.

In Georgia, the wilderness is divided into two sections by a corridor on either side of the Tallulah River. The western part of the Wilderness in Georgia includes the portion of the Appalachian Trail that begins at Blue Ridge Gap and climbs over Rocky Knob in Towns County before passing over the eastern flank of Rich Knob in Rabun County and entering North Carolina at Bly Gap. The eastern part of the Wilderness in Georgia includes an area on Coleman River.

In connection with its management of the Wilderness, the Forest Service actively promotes adherence to the Leave No Trace principles.

The wilderness was closed during the 2016 Rock Mountain fire.

See also
List of U.S. Wilderness Areas
Wilderness Act

References

External links 
Description and Maps of the Southern Nantahala Wilderness
Wilderness.net entry for the Southern Nantahala Wilderness
Gorp.com entry for the Southern Nantahala Wilderness
Leave No Trace organization

Protected areas of Clay County, North Carolina
IUCN Category Ib
Wilderness areas of the Appalachians
Protected areas of Macon County, North Carolina
Protected areas of Rabun County, Georgia
Protected areas of Towns County, Georgia
Wilderness areas of Georgia (U.S. state)
Wilderness areas of North Carolina
Protected areas established in 1984
Nantahala National Forest
Chattahoochee-Oconee National Forest
1984 establishments in Georgia (U.S. state)
1984 establishments in North Carolina